Yauatcha is a Chinese restaurant in Broadwick Street, Soho, London, England, specialising in dim sum.

The restaurant was created in 2004 by Alan Yau, who previously created the Japanese Wagamama and  Thai Busaba Eathai restaurant chains as well as the more expensive Hakkasan restaurant, also in London. Like Hakkasan, Yauatcha gained a Michelin star rating in 2005, which it lost in 2019.

In January 2008, Yau sold a majority interest in Yauatcha and Hakkasan to Tasameem, part of the Abu Dhabi Investment Authority.

Yauatcha opened a branch in Mumbai in December 2011, and another branch in Bangalore in September 2013, Delhi in November 2013 Kolkata in September 2014, with Honolulu and Houston locations both opening later in 2017. The Honolulu and Houston locations have since closed.

See also 
 List of Chinese restaurants

References

External links 
 

Restaurants established in 2004
Buildings and structures in the City of Westminster
Chinese restaurants in the United Kingdom
Michelin Guide starred restaurants in the United Kingdom
Asian restaurants in London
Chinese community in the United Kingdom
Tourist attractions in the City of Westminster